Matco Tools, Inc. is an American professional tool distribution franchise for the automotive and other industries and is based in Stow, Ohio, United States.  This includes over 13,000 different tools such as wrenches, screw drivers, gauges, and specialty tools. Matco produces their own line of toolboxes in their Jamestown, NY manufacturing plant.  They manufacture and contract the production of many air tools, electric tools, hand tools and diagnostic tools..  The company was founded in 1946 and began selling direct to professional mechanics in 1979. Originally Matco was the box manufacturing division of Mac Tools. However, they have not been associated with Mac since Matco Tools was formed in 1979. Former corporate owner Danaher spun off several subsidiaries, including Matco, in 2016 to create Fortive. Fortive, in turn, spun off Matco and other brands as Vontier in 2020.

Distribution
Similar to Snap-on, Cornwell and many Mac Tools dealers, Matco Tools are sold by a local tool distributor who owns a territory by means of a franchise. The franchise owner drives to the work locations of potential customers, and typically offers financing to individuals looking to buy their tools.  Matco trucks are easily identified by their white color with large blue and red Matco logo on the side.

NMTC, Inc. d/b/a/Matco Tools ("MATCO") is a Delaware corporation, incorporated on January 12, 1993. Matco is a wholly owned subsidiary of Matco Tools Corporation ("MTC"). MTC is a New Jersey corporation.

Matco has used Fortive Business System (FBS) to grow its distribution model and build strong customer and franchisee relationships through digital marketing.

Wage Theft 
On April 28th, 2022, Matco Tools paid more than $15 million to resolve allegations that it misclassified employees as contractors in order to avoid paying its workers overtime pay and deny them of their mandated breaks.

Motorsport sponsorships
Matco sponsors, or has sponsored, several professional racing teams, including 3-time Top Fuel champion and 45-time NHRA winner Antron Brown, and NHRA Super Comp champion and Funny Car racer Jack Beckman.

References

External links
 

Tool manufacturing companies of the United States
Manufacturing companies based in Ohio
Manufacturing companies established in 1946
Automotive tool manufacturers
1946 establishments in Ohio